The 2015–16 Football League Cup (known as the Capital One Cup for sponsorship purposes) was the 56th season of the Football League Cup. It began on 11 August 2015 and concluded on 28 February 2016. It is a knock-out competition for the top 92 football clubs played in English football league system.

Chelsea were the defending champions, having beaten Tottenham Hotspur 2–0 in the previous season's final. However, they were eliminated in the fourth round by Stoke City on penalties.

Manchester City won the final on 28 February, defeating Liverpool 3–1 in a penalty shoot-out after the match had finished 1–1 after extra-time.

This was the final season in which the tournament was known as the Football League Cup, as it was renamed the EFL Cup in 2016 after the Football League was rebranded as the English Football League (EFL).

Format
The League Cup is open to all 92 members of the Premier League and the Football League and is divided into seven rounds, organised so that 32 teams remain by the third round. Teams involved in European competition during the season receive a bye to the third round, the remaining Premier League teams enter at the second round, and the remaining Football League teams enter at the first round.

The League Cup is played as a knockout cup competition with each tie, except semi-finals, being played as a single match with the winner advancing to the next round. The semi-finals are played over two legs, with each team playing one leg at home, and the team that scores more goals on aggregate over the two legs advances to the finals. If the score is level after 90 minutes, or if the aggregate score is level for semi-finals, then thirty minutes of extra time is played, divided into two fifteen-minutes halves. If the aggregate scores in semi-finals are still level at the end of extra time the tie shall be decided by goals scored away from home counting twice, according to away goals rule. If the tie has not been decided during extra time, it will be decided by penalty shoot-out.

In the first five rounds, the team drawn first will play at home ground, and in the semi-finals the team drawn first will play the first leg at home. The final shall be played on a neutral ground.

Team allocation
Ninety-two teams from the top four English tiers (Premier League, Football League Championship, Football League One and Football League Two) participated.

Distribution
The tournament was organised so that 32 teams remained by the third round. Teams involved in European competition received a bye to the third round, the remaining Premier League teams entered at the second round, and the remaining Football League teams entered at the first round.
Teams involved in European competition enter at the third round.
The remaining Premier League teams entered at the second round.
The remaining Football League teams entered at the first round.

Teams
The labels in the parentheses show how each team qualified for the place of its starting round (the numbers are positions from previous league season meaning that teams promoted to Premier League is listed as Championship teams but ranked above the teams relegated to Football League Championship, and the same applies for all other promotions and relegations):
PL: Premier League
CH: Football League Championship
L1: Football League One
L2: Football League Two
FC: Football Conference
2nd, 3rd, 4th, 5th, 6th, etc.: League position

Round and draw dates
The schedule was as follows.

Note: Matches are played the week commencing on dates above, except the final which is fixed on the 28 February 2016.

First round

Seeding
A total of 72 teams played in the first round: 24 teams from League Two (tier 4), 24 teams from League One (tier 3), and 24 teams from the Championship (tier 2). The draw for the first round was held on 16 June 2015. (Note: The numbers in parentheses are the tier for the team during the 2015–16 season.)

Matches
The matches were played in the week commencing 10 August 2015.

Second round

Seeding
A total of 48 teams play in the second round: 12 teams which enter in this round, and the 36 winners of the first round. The 12 teams entering this round are the teams from the 2015–16 Premier League not involved in any European competition. The draw for the second round was held on 13 August 2015. (Note: The numbers in parentheses are the tier for the team during the 2015–16 season.)

Matches
The matches were played in the week commencing 24 August 2015.

Third round

Teams
A total of 32 teams play in the third round: 8 teams which enter in this round, and the 24 winners of the second round. The 8 teams entering this round are the teams from the  2015–16 Premier League involved in European competition in the 2015–16 season. There was no seeding in this round. The lowest ranked team in this round is Carlisle United who play in the Football League Two in the fourth division of English football.

Matches
The matches were played in the week commencing 21 September 2015.

Fourth round

Teams
A total of 16 teams play in the fourth round, all winners of the third round. There is no seeding in this round. The draw for the fourth round was held on 23 September 2015 after the North London derby. (Note: The numbers in parentheses are the tier for the team during the 2015–16 season.) The lowest ranked teams in this round are Hull City, Middlesbrough, and Sheffield Wednesday who all play in the Football League Championship in the second division of English football.

Matches
The matches were played in the week commencing 26 October 2015.

Fifth round

Teams
A total of 8 teams play in the fifth round, all winners of the fourth round. There is no seeding in this round. The draw for the fifth round was held on 28 October after the completion of the fourth round.

Matches
The matches were played in the week commencing 30 November 2015. The lowest ranked teams in this round are Hull City, Middlesbrough, and Sheffield Wednesday who all play in the Football League Championship in the second division of English football.

Semi-finals

Teams
A total of four teams played in the Semi-finals, all winners of the fifth round. There was no seeding in this round. The draw for the semi-final was held on 2 December 2015 and all of the teams were from Premier League (top tier).

Matches
The semi-finals are played over two legs, with each team playing one leg at home, and the team that scores more goals on aggregate over the two legs advances to the finals.

First leg
The first leg matches were played on 5 and 6 January 2016.

Second leg
The second leg were played on 26 and 27 January 2016.

Final

The League Cup Final was held on 28 February 2016 at Wembley Stadium.

Top goalscorers

Broadcasting rights
The live television rights for the competition were held by the subscription channel Sky Sports, who have held rights to the competition since 1996–97 apart from 2001-02 when the short-lived ITV Digital had exclusive coverage of that season's League Cup competition as part of the original three year TV deal with The Football League.

These matches were televised live by Sky Sports:

See also
2015–16 Premier League
2015–16 Football League Championship
2015–16 Football League One
2015–16 Football League Two
2015–16 FA Cup

References

EFL Cup seasons
Football League Cup
Cup
Football League Cup